Lists of case law cover instances of case law, legal decisions in which the law was analyzed to resolve ambiguities for deciding current cases. They are organized alphabetically, by topic or by country.

Alphabetical lists
These lists are pan-jurisdictional.

R v Lawrence
R. v. Smith

By topic 
 List of cases involving Lord Denning
 List of class-action lawsuits
 List of copyright case law
 List of environmental lawsuits
 List of gender equality lawsuits
 List of patent case law
 List of trademark case law

By country

Australia
 List of Federal Court of Australia cases
 List of High Court of Australia cases
 List of Tasmanian Supreme Court cases
 List of Victorian Supreme Court cases

Bosnia and Herzegovina
List of decisions of the Constitutional Court of Bosnia and Herzegovina

Canada
 List of Supreme Court of Canada cases

Commonwealth
 List of Judicial Committee of the Privy Council cases

International
 List of International Court of Justice cases

United Kingdom
 List of Early Landmark Court Cases
 List of landmark United Kingdom House of Lords cases
 List of United Kingdom House of Lords cases (post 1997)
 List of Scottish legal cases
 List of Supreme Court of Judicature cases

United States
 Lists of United States Supreme Court cases
 List of United States state supreme court cases
 List of United States courts of appeals cases
 United States case law topical index

See also
 Lists of landmark court decisions